Carmen Maria de Araújo Pereira (22 September 1936 – 4 June 2016) was a Bissau-Guinean politician. She served three days as Acting President in 1984, becoming the first woman in this role in Africa and the only one in Guinea-Bissau's history. She had the shortest term as the Acting President, serving only three days in office. She died in Bissau on 4 June 2016.

Early life
Carmen Pereira was the daughter of one of the few African lawyers in the then Portuguese colony. She married at a young age, and both she and her husband became involved in the Guinea-Bissau War of Independence against Portugal following the 1958-61 wave of Decolonization which liberated Guinea-Bissau's neighbors from European rule.

Independence struggle
Pereira's political involvement began in 1962, when she joined the African Party for the Independence of Guinea and Cape Verde (PAIGC), a revolutionary movement that sought independence for Portugal's two colonies in West Africa. She and her husband were both active in the party. Her husband had been involved in the party longer, and she had married young. In 1966, the PAIGC Central Committee began mobilizing women on an equal basis as men, and Pereira became a revolutionary leader, a Political Officer, and a commander. 

While very few women fought in the front lines, the PAIGC was exceptional it pushing for greater gender equality in a society with strongly defined sex roles. Other such women leaders who emerged from this effort in the PAIGC included Teodora Inácia Gomes, and most famously, Titina Silla. Pereira became a high-ranking political leader and delegate to the Pan-African Women's Organization in Algeria. Compelled to leave the country, she lived in Senegal before traveling to the Soviet Union to study medicine.

Politician

Later, on her return to Guinea-Bissau, she was active both in health and political matters. She was elected to the People's National Assembly. She was Deputy President of the assembly from 1973-84. 

Between 1975 and 1980, she served as the Assembly's chair during the government of João Bernardo Vieira. From 1981 to 1983 Pereira was Minister of Health and Social Affairs of Guinea-Bissau. Again chosen President of the People's National Assembly from 1984, she left this post in 1989 to become a Member the Council of State.

As President of the National Assembly, she was Acting President of Guinea-Bissau from 14 to 16 May 1984 as a new constitution was introduced.

Pereira served as a Member the Council of State from 1989 to 1990, and was Minister of State for Social Affairs in 1990 and 1991.  This last made her Deputy Prime Minister of Guinea-Bissau for more than a year. She was dismissed by Vieira in 1992.

References

Further reading
Ly, Aliou. "Revisiting the Guinea-Bissau liberation war: PAIGC, UDEMU and the question of women’s emancipation, 1963–74." Portuguese Journal of Social Science 14, no. 3 (2015): 361-377.

External links
 WOMEN IN POWER 1940-1970, Worldwide Guide to Women in Leadership, guide2womenleaders.com; retrieved 20 January 2009.
 Stephanie Urdang. Fighting Two Colonialisms: Women in Guinea-Bissau. Monthly Review Press (1979); 

1936 births
2016 deaths
People from Bissau
African Party for the Independence of Guinea and Cape Verde politicians
Presidents of Guinea-Bissau
Presidents of the National People's Assembly (Guinea-Bissau)
Members of the National People's Assembly (Guinea-Bissau)
Bissau-Guinean Marxists
Bissau-Guinean women in politics
Female heads of state
20th-century women politicians
Health ministers of Guinea-Bissau
Social affairs ministers of Guinea-Bissau